Home for the Holidays is the first Christmas-themed album and fifth studio album from Darius Rucker, released on October 27, 2014, through Capitol Records Nashville. The album, produced by Frank Rogers, is a collection of twelve Christmas songs, including two originals and a collaboration with Sheryl Crow.

Background and recording
On September 5, 2014, Sheryl Crow posted a picture of herself with Rucker on her Facebook page and wrote: "I love Darius Rucker - Merry Christmas Baby! (I sang on his upcoming Christmas record!)"

On September 15, 2014, it was announced that Rucker had completed his first Christmas album and that it would be released on October 27, 2014.

In an interview with Rolling Stone, Rucker expressed his enthusiasm over his first Christmas album:
"I am so excited to finally make a Christmas album. This has been a lifelong dream, and I hope my fans enjoy listening as much as I enjoyed making it."

Release

Album
Home for the Holidays was released on October 27, 2014, through Capitol Records Nashville.

Reception

Critical

Home for the Holidays received mostly positive feedback from music critics. In a three out of five star review, Stephen Thomas Erlewine of AllMusic states the album "winds up as a perfectly fine Christmas record, suited for those Rucker fans who have stuck with him from Hootie to R&B to country."

Commercial
Home for the Holidays debuted at No. 31 on the US Billboard 200 chart and No. 7 on the US Billboard Top Country Albums chart, selling 9,000 copies in its first week.  It rose to No. 3 on the Top Country Albums chart in  its fifth week of release, and No. 25 on the Billboard 200 on its sixth week. As of December 2016 the album has sold 220,800 copies in the US.

Track listing

Chart performance

Weekly charts

Year-end charts

Release history

References

External links
Darius Rucker talks about Home For The Holidays on Ben Sorensen's REAL Country

2014 Christmas albums
Christmas albums by American artists
Country Christmas albums
Darius Rucker albums
Capitol Records Christmas albums
Albums produced by Frank Rogers (record producer)